Eugenio Pucciarelli (August 28, 1907 – January 3, 1995) was an Argentine writer. He got a doctorate in philosophy in 1937, and worked as a teacher at the universities of Tucumán, La Plata and Buenos Aires. He was declared professor Emeritus of the UBA. He was the president of the National Academy of Sciences of Buenos Aires.

References

Argentine male writers
Argentine people of Italian descent
People from La Plata
1907 births
1995 deaths